William Willson may refer to:

 William H. Willson (1805–1856), pioneer of the U.S. state of Oregon
 William Willson (businessman) (1927–2003?), chairman of Aston Martin, 1972–1975
 William Gore Willson (1882–1953), Canadian politician
 William David Willson (1865–1932), political figure in British Columbia

See also
 Robert William Willson, English Roman Catholic bishop
 William Wilson (disambiguation)